"Slow Rivers" is a duet by English musicians Elton John and Cliff Richard, released as a single in 1986. Written by John and Bernie Taupin, the song was included on John's 1986 album Leather Jackets.

Commercial reception
The single peaked at number 44 in the singers' native United Kingdom, but was a bigger hit in Belgium and Ireland, where it reached number 24 and number 25 respectively.

Music video
The video for "Slow Rivers" was directed by Mike Brady.

Track listings
UK 7" single
"Slow Rivers" – 3:08
"Billy and the Kids" – 4:22

UK 12" single
"Slow Rivers" – 3:08
"Billy and the Kids" – 4:22
"Lord of the Flies" – 4:30

Charts

References

External links
"Slow Rivers" at Discogs

1986 singles
Elton John songs
Cliff Richard songs
Songs with music by Elton John
Songs with lyrics by Bernie Taupin
Song recordings produced by Gus Dudgeon
The Rocket Record Company singles
Male vocal duets